Samuel Neuberger  was an American attorney for International Labor Defense.

Career

In 1941, Neuberger represented City College of New York chemistry professor Morris U. Cohen before the Rapp-Coudert Committee.

In 1953, Neuberger represented Cohen again, this time, before the US Senate Internal Security Subcommittee (SISS).

References

External sources
 Tamiment Library - Oral Histories - Samuel Neuberger

American lawyers
Year of death missing
Year of birth missing